Richard Llewellyn-Davies, Baron Llewelyn-Davies (24 December 1912 – 27 October 1981) was a British architect.

Career
He worked at the Architecture Association where his contemporaries included Elizabeth Chesterton and Ann MacEwan.
     
Llewelyn-Davies was Professor of Architecture at The Bartlett, University College London from 1960 to 1969, and Professor of Urban Planning and Head of the School of Environmental Studies from 1970 to 1975. He was the designer of Milton Keynes, Buckinghamshire.

On 16 January 1964, he was created a life peer with the title Baron Llewelyn-Davies, of Hastoe in the County of Hertfordshire.

He was married to Patricia Parry, having three children. As his wife was made a life peeress, they were one of the few couples who both held titles in their own right.

Llewelyn-Davis was the son of Moya Llewelyn-Davies and the grandson of Irish MP James O'Connor and a first cousin of the Llewelyn Davies boys.

Professional career

In 1960, Richard Llewelyn-Davies and John Weeks formed the architectural and planning practice Llewelyn-Davies Weeks, which became one of the most influential hospital design and master planning companies in the UK. Major early commissions included the design of Northwick Park Hospital and offices for The Times newspaper. 

The company grew with the addition of Walter Bor in 1964 and become Llewelyn-Davies, Weeks, Forestier-Walker, and Bor, and was known for the master planning of Milton Keynes. The company now trades as 'Llewelyn Davies' and retains the name 'Llewelyn Davies Weeks Ltd' in memory of the founding partners.

Arms

References

1912 births
1981 deaths
Life peers
British urban planners
20th-century English architects
Academics of University College London
Architects from London
Spouses of life peers
Life peers created by Elizabeth II